The 1966 Tour de Suisse was the 30th edition of the Tour de Suisse cycle race and was held from 12 June to 19 June 1966. The race started and finished in Zürich. The race was won by Ambrogio Portalupi of the Vittadello team.

General classification

References

1966
Tour de Suisse